Bradina itysalis is a moth species in the family Crambidae. It was described by Pierre Viette in 1957. It is found on Príncipe island, São Tomé and Príncipe.

References

Moths described in 1957
Bradina
Moths of São Tomé and Príncipe
Taxa named by Pierre Viette